Francesca Maria Barbara Donner (Peurancheseuka Doneo; June 15, 1900March 19, 1992) was the inaugural First Lady of South Korea, from 1948 to 1960, as the second wife of Syngman Rhee, the first president of the Republic of Korea.

Personal name
According to birth documents, she was born Franziska Donner. She later used the spelling Franzeska Donner (even in official documents). Otherwise, the most common spelling of her name was the Italian form, Francesca. This version is used in all of her South Korean documents (including her passport).

Early life and education
Donner was born in the municipality of Inzersdorf, a suburb of the capital Vienna which was incorporated into the City of Vienna, into the family of a soda water industrialist. She was the daughter of Franziska (Gerhartl) and Rudolf Donner. She graduated with a Ph.D. in languages from the University of Vienna, before working at the League of Nations in Geneva as an interpreter and lower-level diplomat. In 1933, she met Korean politician Syngman Rhee (Yi Seung-man 이승만) in a Geneva hotel. At the time Rhee was living in the United States and was on a visit in Geneva. He visited Donner shortly afterwards in Austria and asked to marry her. Donner followed him to the United States and the marriage took place in 1934 in New York. For both, it was their second marriage.

Career

Donner and Rhee lived initially in New York and Washington, D.C., and then in Hawaii, where a large Korean expatriate community-in-exile was politically active. Donner worked in the U.S. as Rhee's secretary, particularly in the preparation of the book Japan Inside Out (1940).

After the defeat of Japan in World War II, Rhee returned to Korea in October 1945 with the support of the U.S. government and Donner followed him there a few months later.

In March 1948, Rhee was elected first president of South Korea, an office he held until 1960. "Francesca Rhee" was from 1948 to 1960 the first First Lady of South Korea. She appeared at her husband's side in almost all public functions.

When the Rhees were forced into exile in 1960, they settled in Hawaii. Donner cared for her husband after he suffered a stroke and until his death on July 19, 1965. She then returned to Austria.

Later life
After five years of residence in Austria, which she had left more than 30 years earlier, Donner returned to South Korea in 1970. She lived from 1970 to 1992 in Seoul, specifically in the Ihwajang, the former home of President Rhee, together with their adopted son,  (Yi In-su) and his family.

Death
Donner died on March 19, 1992, in Seoul, South Korea.

See also 

 First Lady of South Korea
 Chiang Fang-liang
 Ruth Williams Khama

References

External links

 

1900 births
1992 deaths
Austrian women in politics
Austrian emigrants to South Korea
First Ladies of South Korea
People from Liesing
Austrian expatriates in the United States
Burials at Seoul National Cemetery